Pope Boniface II (died 17 October 532) was the first Germanic bishop of Rome. He ruled the Holy See from 22 September 530 until his death on 17 October 532.

Boniface's father's name was Sigibuld. He was probably born in Rome, and was designated to succeed to the papacy by his predecessor, Felix IV, who had been a strong adherent of the Arian Ostrogothic kings. Boniface was later elected, largely due to the influence of King Athalaric. For a time, he served as pope in competition with Dioscorus, who had been elected by most of the priests of Rome.  Boniface and Dioscorus were both consecrated in Rome on 22 September 530, but Dioscurus died only twenty-two days later.

Boniface II's most notable act was confirming the decisions of the Council of Orange, teaching that grace is always necessary to obtain salvation. Boniface was buried in St. Peter's on 17 October 532.

References

Sources

External links

 Documenta Catholica Omnia 
 http://www.newadvent.org/cathen/02660a.htm

532 deaths
Burials at St. Peter's Basilica
German popes
6th-century Ostrogothic people
Ostrogothic Papacy
Popes
Year of birth unknown
6th-century popes